Pretend Or Surrender is Finnish band Lovex's second studio album released on 30.04.2008 in Finland. Album contains for example the song Take A Shot.

Songs 

 "If She's Near"
 "Turn"
 "Take A Shot"
 "Different Light"
 "Writings On The Wall"
 "Time And Time Again"
 "Belong To No One"
 "My Isolation"
 "Rid Of Me"
 "Ordinary Day"
 "End Of The World"
 "End Of The World (Outro)

There is also "Save Me" and "Love and Lust" on the Limited Edition of Pretend Or Surrender.

Singles 
 Take A Shot (27.2.2008)
 Turn (28.5.2008)

Members 
 Theon - vocals
 Vivian Sin'amor - guitar
 Sammy Black - guitar
 Jason - bass
 Julian Drain - drums
 Christian - piano

Pretend Or Surrender
Pretend Or Surrender
GUN Records albums